Papi Khomane (born 31 January 1975) is a South African former footballer who played at both professional and international levels as a defender. Khomane played club football for Jomo Cosmos and Orlando Pirates; he also earned nine caps for the South African national side between 1998 and 2000.

References

External links

1975 births
Living people
South African soccer players
South Africa international soccer players
2000 African Cup of Nations players
Jomo Cosmos F.C. players
Orlando Pirates F.C. players
Association football defenders